Darevskia adjarica is a lizard species in the genus Darevskia. It is found in Georgia and Turkey.

References

Darevskia
Reptiles described in 1980
Taxa named by Ilya Darevsky